Söğütlü is a village in the Nusaybin District of Mardin Province in Turkey. The village is populated by Kurds and had a population of 332 in 2021.

History 
The village had around thirty Christian families in 1968 who spoke Turoyo. Kurdish was also spoken by some in the village.

References 

Villages in Nusaybin District
Kurdish settlements in Mardin Province
Historic Assyrian communities in Turkey